Lucile Lefevre  (born 10 November 1995) is a French snowboarder who competes internationally.
 
She represented France at the 2018 Winter Olympics.

References

External links

1995 births
Living people
French female snowboarders 
Olympic snowboarders of France 
Snowboarders at the 2018 Winter Olympics 
Snowboarders at the 2022 Winter Olympics
Snowboarders at the 2012 Winter Youth Olympics
21st-century French women